Putative RNA-binding protein Luc7-like 2 is a protein that in humans is encoded by the LUC7L2 gene.

References

Further reading